Fred Dabanka (born 17 June 1993) is a Qatari born Ghanaian footballer. He currently plays as a defender.

External links

References

Ghanaian footballers
Qatari footballers
1993 births
Living people
Al Ahli SC (Doha) players
Mesaimeer SC players
Al-Shamal SC players
Al-Markhiya SC players
Qatar Stars League players
Qatari Second Division players
Association football defenders
Ghanaian emigrants to Qatar
Naturalised citizens of Qatar
Qatari people of Ghanaian descent